Khipsta is a river in the  West Caucasus in Abkhazia. It originates on the southern slopes of the mountain . 
It flows into the Black Sea near city Gudauta.

References

Rivers of Abkhazia
Rivers of Georgia (country)
Tributaries of the Black Sea